Barnard Castle railway station was situated on the South Durham & Lancashire Union Railway between Bishop Auckland and Kirkby Stephen East. The railway station served the town of Barnard Castle.

The first station (at ) opened to passenger traffic on 9 July 1856, and was closed to passengers on 1 May 1862 when services were diverted to the second station which had opened in 1861.  Freight traffic continued to use the first station until 1965.

The second station closed to passengers on 30 November 1964.

Today the site of the second station is a car park for the nearby GlaksoSmithKline factory.

References

External links
Barnard Castle station at Disused Stations

South Durham and Lancashire Union Railway
Disused railway stations in County Durham
Former North Eastern Railway (UK) stations
Railway stations in Great Britain opened in 1856
Railway stations in Great Britain closed in 1964
Beeching closures in England
1861 establishments in England
Barnard Castle